Agata Hikari  was a Japanese novelist and translator. She won many awards throughout her career, but was best known for her Noma Literary Prize-winning novel .

Biography 
Hikari was born Kazue Asai in Tokyo, Japan on January 25, 1943. Her father was a police officer. She attended Waseda University, but dropped out and became a copywriter. After fifteen years of marriage, she divorced and began writing fiction in 1982. Hikari also worked as a translator.

Uhoho Tankentai was adapted into the film House of Wedlock. Her 1986  won the Noma Literary Prize. Her 1988  was nominated for the Yamamoto Shūgorō Prize. Many of her works were also nominated for other awards. Her works frequently included themes of divorce, family relationships, and life as a woman.

Hikari died on September 6, 1992 of stomach cancer.

Selected works 

 , 1982
 , 1983
 , 1984
 , 1986
 , 1986
 , 1988

References 

1943 births
1992 deaths
People from Tokyo
20th-century Japanese novelists
Deaths from stomach cancer